Muhammad Naeem Khan is a retired Pakistani diplomat and former Assistant Secretary General of Organization of Islamic Cooperation OIC.

He was appointed by Government of Pakistan as Pakistani Ambassador to Saudi Arabia from 20 June 2011 to 27 May 2014, before being elected as Assistant Secretary General of OIC. He also served as Additional Foreign Secretary and Spokesperson at Foreign Office of Pakistan.

References

Ambassadors of Pakistan to Saudi Arabia
Year of birth missing (living people)
Living people